Changle railway station is a railway station in Changle District, Fuzhou, Fujian, China. It opened with the Fuzhou–Pingtan railway on 26 December 2020.

References

Railway stations in Fujian
Railway stations in China opened in 2020